Ronuel Egbert Greenidge is a Guyanese chess player. He has competed at several Guyana National Chess Championships and in 2008 defeated Errol Tiwari but was eventually defeated by the champion Kriskal Persaud on a tie breaker.

References

Guyanese chess players
Living people
1983 births